White Horse Lake is located  southeast of Williams in North Central Arizona.

History 
White Horse Lake is man-made. The dam was constructed in 1934–35 for the resident of Williams for recreational purposes.

Fish species
 Rainbow Trout
 Largemouth Bass
 Sunfish
 Catfish (Channel)
 Brown Trout
 Black Crappie

References

External links
 Arizona Boating Locations Facilities Map
 Arizona Fishing Locations Map
 Video of White Horse Lake
 

Lakes of Arizona
Lakes of Coconino County, Arizona